The abbreviation LAPD most commonly refers to the Los Angeles Police Department.

LAPD may also refer to:
 L.A.P.D. (band), an American heavy metal band
 The Large Plasma Device a plasma physics research machine at UCLA
 "L.A.P.D." (The Offspring), a song by The Offspring
 LAPD: Life On the Beat, a reality television show
 Future Cop: LAPD, a Sony PlayStation video-game
 Los Angeles Poverty Department, Skid Row neighborhood performance group